Events in the year 1876 in Norway.

Incumbents
Monarch: Oscar II

Events
22 February - Sofie Johannesdotter was beheaded by axe for trifold murder, she was the last woman to be executed in Norway.
25 February - Kristoffer Nilsen Svartbækken Grindalen  was beheaded by axe for murder, it was witnessed by estimated 2,500 spectators, it was the last public execution in Norway.

Arts and literature

Births

January to June
8 January – Nils Tveit, politician (died 1949)
23 March – Nils Erik Flakstad, businessperson and politician (died 1939)
22 April – Ole Edvart Rølvaag, novelist and professor in America (died 1931)
9 May – Johan Arndt, politician (died 1933)
18 May – Thorvald Astrup, architect (died 1940)
11 June – Christen Gran Bøgh, jurist, tourism promoter and theatre critic (died 1955)

July to December
22 August – Christen Wiese, sailor and Olympic gold medallist (died 1968)
16 September – Albert Helgerud, rifle shooter and Olympic gold medallist (died 1954)
24 September – Jacob Thorkelson, elected official, naval officer and medical doctor in America (died 1945)
18 October – Erik Colban, diplomat (died 1956)
19 October – Oluf Christian Müller, politician (died 1938)
21 November – Olav Duun, novelist (died 1939)
8 December – Jan Østervold, sailor and Olympic gold medallist (died 1945)

Full date unknown
Edvin Alten, judge (died 1967)
Olaf Amundsen, politician and Minister (died 1939)
Sverre Hassel, polar explorer (died 1928)
Lars Olai Meling, politician and Minister (died 1951)
Embrik Strand, arachnologist (died 1947)
Ole Nikolai Ingebrigtsen Strømme, politician and Minister (died 1936)

Deaths
18 January – Asbjorn Kloster, social reformer and leader of the Norwegian temperance movement (born 1823)
22 February - Sofie Johannesdotter, serial killer (born 1839)
25 February - Kristoffer Nilsen Svartbækken Grindalen, criminal, killer and thief (born 1804)
8 May – Christian Lassen, orientalist (born 1800)
20 July - Hans Riddervold, bishop and politician (born 1795)

Full date unknown
Karelius August Arntzen, politician (born 1802)
Eilev Jonsson Steintjønndalen, Hardanger fiddle maker (born 1821)

See also